|}

The Railway Stakes is a Group 2 flat horse race in Ireland open to two-year-old thoroughbreds. It is run at the Curragh over a distance of 6 furlongs (1,207 metres), and it is scheduled to take place each year in late June or early July.

History
The event was established in 1851, and it was originally contested over 6 furlongs. It was extended by 63 yards in 1897.

The race became known as the Railway Plate in 1946. It reverted to the title Railway Stakes in 1956. It was given Group 3 status in the early 1970s.

The Railway Stakes was shortened to 6 furlongs in 1984. It was promoted to Group 2 level in 2003. It is currently held on the same day as the Irish Derby.

Records

Leading jockey since 1950 (7 wins):
 Christy Roche – Misty Bend (1973), Tender Camilla (1974), Noble Shamus (1979), Anfield (1981), Armanasco (1989), Ivory Frontier (1992), King of Kings (1997)

Leading trainer since 1950 (14 wins):
 Vincent O'Brien – Turbo Jet (1962), Glad Rags (1965), Sahib (1968), Nijinsky (1969), Minsky (1970), Open Season (1971), Niebo (1975), Brahms (1976), Solar (1978), Lawmaker (1980), Ancestral (1982), El Gran Senor (1983), Moscow Ballet (1984), El Prado (1991)

Winners since 1980

Earlier winners

 1851: Indian Warrior
 1852: no race
 1853: Ariadne
 1854: no race
 1855: Fireblast
 1856: Blight
 1857: Darling
 1858: Drogheda
 1859: Glory
 1860: The Lawyer
 1861: Socrates
 1862: The Plover
 1863: Union Jack
 1864: Zisca
 1865: Monitor
 1866: Master Willie
 1867: Uncas
 1868: Melody
 1869: Sarsfield
 1870: Richard the First
 1871: Maid of Perth
 1872: Queen of the Bees
 1873: Lady Patricia
 1874: Wild Duck
 1875: Maelstrom
 1876: Mayfield
 1877: Athy
 1878: Shinglass
 1879: Sibyl
 1880: Barcaldine
 1881: Melliflor
 1882: Peace
 1883: Grecian Bend
 1884: Kilcreene
 1885: Ashplant
 1886: Kildare
 1887: May Moon
 1888: St Kieran
 1889: Meliboeus
 1890: Eyrefield
 1891: Christabel
 1892: Baccarat
 1893: Gazetteer
 1894: Angelus
 1895: Winkfield's Pride
 1896: General Peace
 1897: Sabine Queen
 1898: Oppressor
 1899: Rapine
 1900: Gogo
 1901: St Brendan
 1902: Fariman
 1903: Jean's Folly
 1904: Sir Daniel
 1905: Juliet
 1906: Electric Rose
 1907: Twenty-Third
 1908: Bachelor's Double
 1909: Trepida
 1910: Cigar
 1911: Simon Lass
 1912: Flax Meadow
 1913: King's Common
 1914: no race
 1915: Shining More
 1916: Durazzo
 1917: Lady Earn
 1918: Confey
 1919: Blue Dun
 1920: Shanganagh
 1921: Rachel
 1922: Darragh
 1923: Vesington Star
 1924: Capture Him
 1925: Silver Lark
 1926: Lavengro
 1927: Cardinal's Ring
 1928: Soloptic
 1929: Confetti
 1930: Sea Serpent
 1931: Rathlin Isle
 1932: Song of the Hills
 1933: Kyloe
 1934: Poor Jack
 1935: Hocus Pocus
 1936: Burdock
 1937: Rosewell
 1938: Bessbrook
 1939: Monster Light
 1940: Milady Rose
 1941: Windsor Slipper
 1942: Fabulous
 1943: Arctic Sun
 1944: Knight's Emblem
 1945: Linaria
 1946: Dublin Town
 1947: Asylum
 1948: Fair Edwine
 1949: Monseigneur
 1950: Ralootown
 1951: Stackallen Bridge
 1952: Legend of Confey
 1953: Tale of Two Cities
 1954: Hugh Lupus
 1955: Closed Shop
 1956: Katty's Star
 1957: Vestogan
 1958: Princess Marie
 1959: Le Levanstell
 1960: Travel Light
 1961: Gay Challenger
 1962: Turbo Jet
 1963: Mesopotamia
 1964: Ga-Greine
 1965: Glad Rags
 1966: Adrian's Path
 1967: Sans-Fin
 1968: Sahib
 1969: Nijinsky
 1970: Minsky
 1971: Open Season
 1972: Park Lawn
 1973: Misty Bend
 1974: Tender Camilla
 1975: Niebo
 1976: Brahms
 1977: Thunor
 1978: Solar
 1979: Noble Shamus

See also
 Horse racing in Ireland
 List of Irish flat horse races

References
 Paris-Turf:
 Racing Post:

 galopp-sieger.de – Railway Stakes.
 horseracingintfed.com – International Federation of Horseracing Authorities – Railway Stakes (2018).
 irishracinggreats.com – Railway Stakes (Group 2).
 pedigreequery.com – Railway Stakes – Curragh.
 tbheritage.com – Railway Stakes.

Flat races in Ireland
Curragh Racecourse
Flat horse races for two-year-olds
Recurring sporting events established in 1851
1851 establishments in Ireland